Branston Water Park is a local nature reserve near Burton upon Trent, in Staffordshire, England, adjacent to the village of Branston.

History
The lake is a former gravel pit, one of several along the Trent Valley. There was gravel extraction here from the 1930s to the 1950s, after which wildlife habitats developed naturally. In the mid 1980s the land was leased by East Staffordshire Borough Council; public access was introduced, and the site was developed as a country park, with pathways, signage and a visitor centre.

The reserve was designated a local nature reserve (LNR) in 2010. , it has held the Green Flag Award since 2005.

Description
The Trent and Mersey Canal passes alongside the site to the north-west; to the south- east is the A38 road.

It is a notable wetland site, and around the lake is woodland, predominantly of willow and birch, and wildflower meadow. There is a large reed bed, which is a Grade 1 Staffordshire Site of Biological Importance.

There is a flat circular path around the lake, and there are picnic areas and a children's play area. The Burton Mutual Angling Association and the Burton Model Boating Club use the park by agreement with East Staffordshire Borough Council.

References

External links
Branston Water Park leaflet

Local nature reserves in Staffordshire
Lakes of Staffordshire
Parks and open spaces in Staffordshire